BEE Japan (Bicycle for Everyone's Earth) is a group of people from Japan and other countries that promotes environmental awareness and ecological lifestyles in Japan. The group's main event is an annual 2 month bicycle ride, beginning in August, from the northernmost island of Japan (Hokkaido) to the southernmost (Kyushu, and occasionally Okinawa). The route changes every year, and generally covers 2,500 to 3,500 kilometers. Each year has a different coordinator and team of riders, and a different environmental focus.

The BEE ride uses both direct action and education to promote environmental awareness and ecological lifestyles.

BEE's direct action 
 Traveling the length of Japan exclusively by bicycle
 Eating low on the food chain
 Choosing organic products whenever possible
 Choosing fair trade products whenever possible
 Supporting local economies by buying local produce
 Using no vending machines
 Minimizing waste by choosing less packaged products, buying reusable, recycled and recyclable items, and using no disposable eating utensils.

BEE's educational activities 
Before, after, and (mainly) during the annual ride, BEE members educate local people on environmental issues in a variety of ways.  These include:
 presentations at community centers and schools
 workshops with special groups (NGOs, English study circles, citizen groups, etc.)
 participating with local people in direct actions (environmental clean-ups, bicycle tours, etc.)

Activities aim to create a deep awareness in participants of the extent to which our daily lives effect the ecosystems in which we live. Many topics are covered, but the focus is on bio-interconnectivity, forest destruction, over consumption, and renewable energy sources (human, wind, and solar).

Past rides 
 2007: Energy Production and Conservation, with the Rokkasho Nuclear Reprocessing Plant
 2006: Endangered Species Dugong, with the U.S. Base Issue in Okinawa

References 

Environmental organizations based in Japan